Ullumani (Aymara ulluma Ullucus tuberosus, -ni a suffix to indicate ownership, "the one with ulluma") is a mountain in the Cordillera Real in the Andes of Bolivia, about  high. It is situated in the La Paz Department, Murillo Province, La Paz Municipality. Ullumani lies east of the mountains Sankayuni and Chankuni and north-east of the mountain Kunturiri.

References 

Mountains of La Paz Department (Bolivia)